Francis Leslie Ashton (24 June 1904 – July 1994) was an English writer known for his first novel Breaking of the Seals in 1946 and a kind of sequel Alas, That Great City from 1948. The two novels concern disasters involving objects orbiting the Earth in prehistoric times. In 1952 he co-wrote Wrong Side of the Moon, which concerns space travel.

Personal life
 Francis Leslie Ashton was born on 24 June 1904 in Chapel-en-le-Frith, Derbyshire to Mary Alice and William Ashton. Ashton had two siblings, Elizabeth Bruce (1902–1994) and Stephen Thurstan Ashton (1907–1991).
 Ashton died in Ely, Cambridgeshire in July 1994 aged 90 years.

References

External links

Rootsweb profile

British science fiction writers
1904 births
1994 deaths
20th-century English novelists
English male novelists
20th-century English male writers